McManis is a surname. Notable people with the surname include:

Charles McManis (1913–2004), American pipe organ builder
Sherrick McManis (born 1987), American football player
Wynton McManis (born 1994), American football player

See also
McManus